Patrick K. Hogan was an Irish Farmers' Party politician and farmer. At the 1923 general election he was elected as a Teachta Dála (TD) for the Limerick constituency, one of fifteen Farmers' Party TDs elected that year. He did not stand at the June 1927 general election.

References

Year of birth missing
Year of death missing
Farmers' Party (Ireland) TDs
Members of the 4th Dáil
Politicians from County Limerick
Irish farmers